The 2011–12 Santiago Island League (South) season began on 3 December and finished on 29 April.  Sporting won the regional competition and qualified into the 2012 Cape Verdean Football Championships.  The championship was organized by the Santiago South Regional Football Association (Associação Regional de Futebol de Santiago Sul, ARFSS).

Boavista Praia was the defending team of the title. A total of 20 clubs participated in the competition, each in two divisions.

Overview
One of the greatest matches of the season was part of the Capital Derby featuring Sporting and Boavista which was on February 11.

A total of 245 goals were scored.  Desportivo Praia scored the most numbering 46, second was Sporting Praia with 36 and third was Académica Praia with 26.  7th placed Celtic scored the least with 12, the second least was 8th placed Tchadense and the third least was last placed Vitória with 17. On the opposites, last placed Varanda conceded the most with 34, 8th placed Tchadense concede the second most with 31 and third most was 7th placed Celtic with 29. Sporting conceded the least with 13, second was Desportivo with 15.

The first round was taken by Boa Vista, Académica took it in the second round, Sporting took it in the third round, then Desportivo in the eighth round and again Sporting in the thirteenth round and for the remainder of the season.

Competing Teams
All matches were played at the Estádio da Várzea.

Premier Division

Second Division
ADESBA or Bairro
Asa Grande - Achada Grande Tras
Benfiquinha - Praia
Delta
Lapaloma
Fiorentina de Calabaceira
Garridos - São Domingos
Kuminidade - Calabaceira
União dos Norte - Achada São Filipe/Paiol/Vila Nova
Vilanova

Table

Premier Division

Second Division
1st: ADESBA or Bairro - Craveiro Lopes, Praia

Results

Week 1

Week 2

Week 3

Week 4
13, 14 and 15 January 2012
Travadores 1-3 Boavista
Varanda 0-1 Tchadense
Vitória 0-2 Desportivo
Ribeira Grande 2-3 Sporting
Celtic 1-0 Académica

Week 5
20, 21 and 22 January 2012
Académica 1-1 Ribeira Grande
Desportivo 1-1 Travadores
Vitória 4-1 Varanda
Tchadense 1-4 Sporting Praia
Boavista 1-1 Celtic

Week 6
3, 4 and 5 February 2012
Celtic 1-3 Desportivo
Vitória 1-0 Tchadense
Travadores 2-0 Varanda
Ribeira Grande 2-3 Boa Vista
Sporting 1-0 Académica

Week 7
10, 11 and 12 February 2012
Tchadense 1-2 Academica
Varanda 4-1 Celtic
Boavista 0-0 Sporting
Desportivo 7-3 Ribeira Grande
Vitória 1-2 Travadores

Week 8
17, 18 and 19 February 2012
Celtic 0-2 Vitória
Sporting 1-2 Desportivo
Travadores 1-0 Tchadense
Ribeira Grande 2-2 Varanda
Académica 2-0 Boavista

Week 9
2, 3 and 4 March 2012
Tchadense 0-3 Boavista
Varanda 1-4 Sporting
Vitória 0-1 Ribeira Grande
Travadores 0-0 Celtic
Desportivo 3-0 Académica

Week 10
9, 10, 11 March 2012
Vitória 1-3 Sporting Praia
Travadores 1-2 Ribeira Grande
Desportivo 1-0 Boavista
Varanda 1-1 Académica Praia
Celtic 0-1 Tchadense

Week 11
'16, 17, 18 March 2012Académica 3-1 Vitória
Ribeira Grande 0-0 Celtic
Sporting 1-0 Travadores
Tchadense 0-3 Desportivo
Boavista 2-1 Varanda

Week 1223, 24, 25 March 2012Ribeira Grande 3-0 Tchadense
Vitória 0-1 Boavista
Varanda 1-2 Desportivo
Travadores 4-3 Académica
Celtic 0-1 Sporting

Week 1330, 31 March and 1 April 2012Tchadense 2-1 Varanda
Sporting 3-0 Ribeira Grande
Académica 3-1 Celtic
Desporitvo 0-3 Vitória
Boavista 2-3 Travadores

Week 145, 6 and 7 April 2012Ribeira Grande 2-1 Académica
Sporting Praia 2-1 Tchadense
Celtic 0-1 Boavista
Travadores 1-1 Desportivo
Vitória 1-1 Varanda

Week 1513, 14 and 15 April 2012Varanda 0-2 Travadores
Tchadense 1-1 Vitória
Desportivo 5-1 Celtic
Boavista 1-1 Ribeira Grande
Académica 1-2 Sporting

Week 1617, 18 and 19 April 2012Travadores 1-0 Vitória
Académica 2-1 Tchadense
Ribeira Grande 0-2 Desportivo
Celtic 0-3 Varanda
Sporting 1-1 Boavista

Week 1720, 21 and 22 April 2012Tchadense 2-0 Travadores
Vitória 0-1 Celtic
Boavista 1-1 Académica
Varanda 1-2 Ribeira Grande
Desportivo 0-1 Sporting

Week 1827, 28 and 29 April 2012''
Académica 1-3 Desportivo
Celtic 2-0 Travadores
Sporting 2-1 Varanda
Ribeira Grande 1-4 Vitória
Boavista 2-2 Tchadense

Division Decisional match
The division decisional match was played not long before the next season started in late December.  The first leg was played on December 12 and the second on the 16.  The first leg was scoreless and Varanda won the second leg and Varanda remained in the Premier Division for the following season.

First leg: Varanda 0-0 Fiorentina
Second leg: Fiorentina 1-3 Varanda

Position changes

Statistics
Biggest win: Desportivo 7-0 Varanda (16 December 2011)

References

External links

Santiago South Regional Football Association at the FCF website
2011-12 Santiago South Premier Division

Santiago (South Zone) football seasons
2011–12 in Cape Verdean football
History of Santiago, Cape Verde